Nayak is a 2001 Indian Assamese romantic drama movie directed by Munin Barua and produced under the banner of Pooja Motion Pictures. Music was composed by Zubeen Garg. The film was released on 30 November 2001.

Cast
Jatin Bora as Abinash Choudhary
Ravi Sarma as Anupam
Zerifa Wahid as Borosha
Parineeta Borthakur as Jonali
Hiranya Das as Hemanta Saikia
 Purabi Sarma
 Jayanta Das
 Rajib Goswami
 Arun Hazarika
 Indra Bania (guest appearance)

Soundtrack

The music of Nayak was composed by Zubeen Garg. Lyrics were penned by Hemanta Dutta, Zubeen Garg and Diganta Kalita. The singers who lent their voices in this film are Zubeen Garg, Mahalakshmi Iyer, Saswati Phukan, Arnab Bhattacharya, Shaan, Sagarika and Pamela Jain. The album contains 7 tracks and all were superhit. The song "Lahe Lahe" was later reused as "Shure Shure Gaan Holo" in Shudhu Tumi (2004).

References

External links 
 

Assamese-language films
Films set in Assam
Films shot in Shillong
Films directed by Munin Barua
2000s Assamese-language films